Gevorg Martirosyan , is an Armenian singer and actor. His first video clip was released in 2012 (You are and I am). He has also participated The Voice of Armenia in a group of Tata Simonyan.  He was a guest of "Guess the tune" on 27 October 2015. In 2016 he also made his acting debut in Full House (Armenian TV series) (Season 4).

Filmography

Discography

Singles
 2012 Nov- "Du es Es em"
 2012 Dec- "Snorhavor" (featuring with Armo)
 2013 Feb- "New paths"
 2013 Apr- "Earthly Angel "
 2013 Jun- "Halala"
 2013 Dec- "You are my life"
 2014 May- "I am lucky"
 2015 Mar- "Jan Jan" (Russian)
 2015 Oct- "Wedding Day"
 2016 Jul- "Duy Duy" (featuring with Mets Hayk)

External links 

"Wedding Day" at the YouTube
Official website
Official page on Facebook

References

21st-century Armenian male actors
Armenian male film actors
Living people
Male actors from Yerevan
Musicians from Yerevan
21st-century Armenian male singers
Armenian pop singers
The Voice (franchise) contestants
Armenian folk-pop singers
Year of birth missing (living people)